Mukhathala is a small town and block panchayat in Kollam district of Kerala, India. The area is known for the famous Murari Temple which holds a unique position in the cultural history of Travancore.

This temple is approximately three thousand years old

Administration
G Omana is the present President of the Mukhathala block panchayat. Mukhathala includes 5 Grama panchayats and 15 divisions. The Grama panchayats include
 Mayyanad
 Thrikkovilvattom
 Kottamkara
 Elampalloor
 Nedumpana

Transport 
The nearest railway stations are Kilikkollur Station Kerala State Road Transport Corporation bus services to nearby towns are available regularly Kollam-Kulathupuzha Limited stop chain service Every 20 min

Schools
 St. Jude Higher Secondary School Kureeppally
 Mukhathala Gramodharana Trust High School
 National Public School
 Navdeep Public School
 Upasana Nursing College
 Indian Public School
 NSS School
 Govt. LP School
 Swaralaya Music & Dance school. Murahari junction.

Places of worship
The Pentecostal Mission Church (TPM Faith home),Mukhathala
 Vamanankavu Kshethram, Panakkalam, Mukhathala.
 Mukhathala Sreekrishna Swami Temple
 Udayan Kaavu, Murari Jn, Mukhathala
 Ayyappa Temple, Opp. M.G.T.H.S, Mukhathala
 Mukhathala Marthoma Church Kureeppally
 Masjid Kannanalloor
 St George Orthodox Syrian Church (Kunnuvila pally)
 St Jude Church, mukhathala
 Udayankavu Mahadeva temple, Punukkannoor

References

Cities and towns in Kollam district